The Aslan Pasha Mosque is an Ottoman-built mosque in the city of Ioannina, Greece. The mosque was built in 1618 in the city's castle, replacing the Church of Saint John, which was torn down after the failed anti-Ottoman revolt of 1611 led by Dionysius the Philosopher. Since 1933 it houses the Municipal Ethnographic Museum of Ioannina.

A Mediterranean Sea tropical-like cyclone damaged the minaret on the top of the mosque in September 2018, with restoration processes taking place in August 2019.

See also
 Islam in Greece
 List of former mosques in Greece
 List of mosques in Greece

References

Ottoman architecture in Ioannina
Religious buildings and structures completed in 1618
17th-century mosques
Former mosques in Greece
Ottoman mosques in Greece
1618 establishments in the Ottoman Empire
17th-century architecture in Greece